Viktor Petrók (born 3 April 1981) is a Hungarian football player who currently plays for Kaposvári Rákóczi FC.

References
HLSZ
Kaposvári Rákóczi FC official site

1981 births
Living people
People from Kaposvár
Hungarian footballers
Association football defenders
Kaposvári Rákóczi FC players
Dunaújváros FC players
BFC Siófok players
Kozármisleny SE footballers
Pécsi MFC players
Szeged-Csanád Grosics Akadémia footballers
Nemzeti Bajnokság I players
Hungarian expatriate footballers
Expatriate footballers in Austria
Hungarian expatriate sportspeople in Austria
Nagyatádi FC players
Sportspeople from Somogy County